Melivoia is a settlement in the Xanthi regional unit of Greece and one of the larger villages of the municipality of Myki. It is about 738 km north of Athens, the country's capital, in the region of East Macedonia and Thrace.

The area has two airports, the nearest being Alexander the Great International Airport (IATA: KVA), 75.8 km southwest of Melivoia's center.

Discover Melivoia 

Melivoia in East Macedonia and Thrace (region) is a town located in Greece, about 738 km north of Athens, the country's capital town.

There are two airports in the area of Melivoia. The nearest airport is Alexander the Great International Airport (IATA: KVA) with a distance of 75.8 km south-west of the city centre of Melivoia.

Population 

Populated places in Xanthi (regional unit)